Munze Konza, commonly referred to as KK Zemun, is a men's professional basketball club based in Belgrade, Serbia. They are currently competing in the Central Division of the First Regional Basketball League (3rd-tier). 

Since 2015, the club has been organizing the Dado Trophy of Zemun in honor of their former player and coach Vladimir "Dado" Arnautović.

Sponsorship naming
KK Zemun has had several names through the years due to its sponsorship:

Players

Coaches 

  Predrag Krunić
  Jovica Antonić
  Siniša Matić 
  Nenad Stefanović

Trophies and awards

Trophies
 First Regional League (Central Division) (3rd-tier)
 Winners (1): 2017–18

Notable players 
  Milan Dozet

Youth system
  Novica Veličković
  Vuk Vulikić
  Marko Pecarski
  Uroš Trifunović
  Mario Nakić

See also 
 KK Borac Zemun
 KK Mladost Zemun

References

External links
 Official website 
 Profile at srbijasport.net 
 Profile at eurobasket.com

Sport in Zemun
Basketball teams in Belgrade